The 2020 LPGA of Korea Tour was the 43rd season of the LPGA of Korea Tour, the professional golf tour for women operated by the Korea Ladies Professional Golf' Association. The season began at Twin Doves Golf Club in Vietnam in December 2019.

Schedule
The number in parentheses after winners' names show the player's total number wins in official money individual events on the LPGA of Korea Tour, including that event. A number of events were cancelled due to COVID-19 pandemic.

Events in bold are majors.

References

External links
 

2020
2020 in women's golf
2020 in South Korean sport